Hida is a commune located in Sălaj County, Transylvania, Romania. It is composed of eight villages: Baica (Bányika), Hida, Miluani (Milvány), Păduriș (Tyikló), Racâș (Almásrákos), Sânpetru Almașului (Füzesszentpéter), Stupini (Füzes) and Trestia (Komlósújfalu).

Miluani
The village of Miluani had 112 inhabitants in 2002 and is famous for its grain and sunflower production.
The settlement was first mentioned in Hungarian documents in 1320 as Miluad. From the 13th century the area was property of the Hungarian Zsombor clan. In the 14th century it was donated to the Elefánthy family. A Romanian Orthodox church was built in the 16th century and a new one in 1920. Miluani is the filia of the Roman Catholic parish of Chidea; traditionally its vicars were Franciscans until 1897. Local Unitarians also belongs to Chidea. Miluani was also a center of the Greek-Catholic arch-deaconry. 

Miluani historically was part of Transylvania within the Kingdom of Hungary. It belonged to Doboka County until 1876, when it was incorporated into Kolozs county. In 1920, after World War I and the Treaty of Trianon, the village, as part of Transylvania, was handed over to Romania.

In 1940, by the Second Vienna Arbitration, it was again annexed by Hungary. In 1944 ethnic Romanian rebels of Miluani burnt up the Hungarian Reformed Church's archive in Hida. 
The Jewish population of Hidalmás (26.0% in 1910) was deported to Auschwitz by the Hungarian government in May 1944.
 
Among those who have resided in the village include Sándor Kendi, a Hungarian magnate and József Nyírő, a Hungarian writer and politician, and vicar in Miluani.

Natives
 Eugen Ciucă

Sights

 Wooden Church in Baica, built in the 17th century (1645), historic monument
 Wooden Church in Hida, built in the 18th century (1717), historic monument
 Wooden Church in Racâș, built in the 16th century (1558), historic monument
 Wooden Church in Sânpetru Almașului, built in the 18th century (1795), historic monument
 Orthodox Church in Miluani, built in the 16th century, historic monument
 Hida, Manor Hatfaludy, built in the 20th century (1916), historic monument 
 Hida, Devil's Rock Nature reserve (Natural monument)
 Meadow with daffodils from Racâș-Hida, Natural reserve

External links
 Petri Mór: Szilágy vármegye monographiája
 CIMEC – Établissements religieux en Roumanie
 CIMEC – Établissements religieux en Roumanie 
Etnikumközi kapcsolatok Erdélyben
 Kereső: Milvány
 1877. évi I. törvénycikk

References

Communes in Sălaj County
Localities in Transylvania
eo:Miluani